Chelis mustangbhoti is a moth in the family Erebidae. It was described by Franz Daniel in 1961. It is found in Nepal.

This species was moved from the genus Palearctia to Chelis as a result of phylogenetic research published in 2016.

References

Moths described in 1961
Arctiina